Jennifer Hawkrigg (born 26 August 1996) is a Canadian snowboarder who competes internationally in the alpine snowboard discipline.

Career
Hawkrigg has competed at two Senior World Championships in 2019 and 2021.

In January 2022, Hawkrigg was initially not named to Canada's 2022 Olympic team. However, after an appeal process, Hawkrigg along with three other snowboarders were added to the team in the parallel giant slalom event.

References

External links
 

1996 births
Living people
Sportspeople from Toronto
Canadian female snowboarders
Snowboarders at the 2022 Winter Olympics
Olympic snowboarders of Canada